The enzyme citramalate lyase catalyzes the chemical reaction

(2S)-2-hydroxy-2-methylbutanedioate  acetate + pyruvate

This enzyme belongs to the family of lyases, specifically the oxo-acid-lyases, which cleave carbon-carbon bonds.  The systematic name of this enzyme class is (2S)-2-hydroxy-2-methylbutanedioate pyruvate-lyase (acetate-forming). Other names in common use include citramalate pyruvate-lyase, citramalate synthase, citramalic-condensing enzyme, citramalate synthetase, citramalic synthase, (S)-citramalate lyase, (+)-citramalate pyruvate-lyase, citramalate pyruvate lyase, (3S)-citramalate pyruvate-lyase, and (2S)-2-hydroxy-2-methylbutanedioate pyruvate-lyase.  This enzyme participates in c5-branched dibasic acid metabolism.

References

 
 

EC 4.1.3
Enzymes of unknown structure